Lance Blanks (born September 9, 1966) is an American former professional basketball player and executive who works as an analyst for ESPN. He played in the National Basketball Association (NBA) for the Detroit Pistons and Minnesota Timberwolves. Blanks also spent several seasons playing in Europe. Blanks worked as the general manager of the Phoenix Suns from 2010 to 2013.

College career

Blanks was inducted into Texas Athletics' Longhorn Hall of Honor in 2007.

Selected Mr. Basketball for Texas in 1985, Blanks played collegiately at the University of Virginia and the University of Texas at Austin.  Blanks and teammates Travis Mays and Joey Wright were known as the "BMW Scoring Machine" during the 1989–90 basketball season.  That Longhorn team finished second in the Southwest Conference and advanced to the Elite Eight in the 1990 NCAA Men's Division I Basketball Tournament.  Blanks drew strong criticism and gained many detractors for his on-court antics and unsportsmanlike, excessive celebration, such as at the Elite Eight of the 1990 tournament.

With 1,322 points, Blanks holds the record for the highest number of points by a two-year player and is the eighth-leading scorer in University of Texas history. Blanks ended his career at Texas as the all-time leader in steals and stands fourth place in career scoring average with 20.0 points per game.

NBA career

A guard, Blanks played for the Pistons and Minnesota Timberwolves in three NBA seasons.

Post-playing career

From 2010 to 2013, Blanks served as the general manager of the Phoenix Suns, a job he earned after five seasons as assistant general manager of the Cleveland Cavaliers.

Prior to joining the Cavaliers, he served as the director of scouting for the San Antonio Spurs. He joined the Spurs in 2000 as a scout and was promoted to director of scouting in September 2002. Also while in San Antonio, Blanks served as the Spurs' television analyst during the 2004–05 season.

Since 2020, Blanks has served as a television analyst for the Texas Longhorns on Longhorn Network.

Personal life

He is the son of Sid Blanks, a former AFL/NFL player and the first-ever Black football player to play in the Lone Star Conference.

His daughter, Riley Blanks was a “four-star recruit” for the University of Virginia tennis team and is the founder of Woke Beauty.

Blanks' cousin is Larvell Blanks, a former Major League Baseball infielder.

Off the court
In 2019, Blanks hosted a symposium on concussive injuries – chronic traumatic encephalopathy (CTE) – at the University of Texas's Center for Sports Communication & Media. His father suffered from Parkinson's Disease after playing professional football for years. Participants at the symposium discussed the effect of football on the human brain and the symbolic importance of the sport in American life.

Blanks has frequently worked with Basketball Without Borders.

Notes

External links

1966 births
21st-century African-American people
20th-century African-American sportspeople
Living people
African-American basketball players
Alba Fehérvár players
American expatriate basketball people in Cyprus
American expatriate basketball people in Germany
American expatriate basketball people in Hungary
American men's basketball players
Basketball players from Texas
Cleveland Cavaliers executives
Detroit Pistons draft picks
Detroit Pistons players
Giessen 46ers players
Keravnos B.C. players
Minnesota Timberwolves players
National Basketball Association general managers
Oklahoma City Cavalry players
Parade High School All-Americans (boys' basketball)
People from The Woodlands, Texas
People from Del Rio, Texas
Phoenix Suns executives
Quad City Thunder players
Shooting guards
Sportspeople from Harris County, Texas
Texas Longhorns men's basketball players
Virginia Cavaliers men's basketball players